The 1920 Missouri gubernatorial election was held on November 2, 1920 and resulted in a victory for the Republican nominee, Arthur M. Hyde, over the Democratic nominee, John M. Atkinson, and several other candidates representing minor parties.

This was the first Missouri gubernatorial election in which more than one million votes were cast, mostly a result of the increased turnout compared to previous elections, due to the 1919 passage and August 18, 1920 ratification of the Nineteenth Amendment to the U.S. Constitution, giving women the right to vote.

Results

References

Missouri
1920
Gubernatorial
November 1920 events in the United States